MLS Goalkeeper of the Year Award, known as the Allstate MLS Goalkepeer of the Year Award for sponsorship purposes, is an annual Major League Soccer award established in 1996. It is voted on by media, MLS players and club management based on regular-season performance. Andre Blake has won the award three times, more than any other goalkeeper.

Winners

Voting finishes (by player)

References

External links
 Winners List

Goalkeeper of the Year
Association football goalkeeper awards
Association football player non-biographical articles